Greatest Hits is the first compilation album (18th over-all) of Filipino TV host, actress-singer Toni Gonzaga and her fifteenth on Star Records (sixth as a solo artist), released on September 30, 2011 in the Philippines in CD format and digital download. It has since sold more than 10,000 copies in the country.

Background
Greatest Hits contains 14 tracks from her five previous albums: three from Toni: You Complete Me, four from Falling in Love, one from Love Is..., two from Love Duets, and four from All Me. It is Toni's first solo compilation album under Star Records and was released on September 30, 2011, during her Toni @ 10: The Anniversary Concert held at Smart Araneta Coliseum.

Track listing
Disc 1

 track 4 - "Kasalanan Ko Ba?"  is a remake of an original song by the Neocolours.
 track 5 - "Crazy For you" a remake of an original song by Madonna and was used as the theme song of ABS-CBN's Crazy For You.
 track 6 - "I've Fallen For You"  is a remake of an original song by Jamie Rivera and was featured in the Star Cinema film, I've Fallen for You starring Gerald Anderson and Kim Chiu.
 track 7 - "Perfect World"  is the carrier track of Level Up Games' online game Perfect World.
 track 8 - "One Hello" is a remake of an original song by Randy Crawford
 track 10 - "I Love You So" was used to promote the Chinese series, I Love You So, Autumn's Concerto starring Vaness Wu and Ady An, when shown in the Philippines.
 track 11 - "If Ever You're In My Arms Again" is a remake of an original song by Peabo Bryson and was used as the theme song of her leading role film, My Big Love.

Personnel
 Malou N. Santos – executive producer
 Annabelle R. Borja – executive producer
 Roque 'rox' B. Santos – all-over project producer
 Jonathan Manalo – audio content head
 Roxy Liquigan – star adprom head
 Jason Alvares – audio marketing strategist and digital marketing head
 Darwin Chiang – promo specialist
 Marivic Benedicto – star songs, inc. and new media head
 Beth Faustino – music publishing manager
 Eaizen Almazan – new media technical assistant
 Jan Michael Ibanez – project coordinator
 Andrew Castillo – creative head
 Justin Mark Marcos – album design and layout
 Doc Marlon Pecto – photographer
 AJ Alberto – stylist
 Macy Dionido – hair stylist
 Krist Bansuelo – make up artist

References

2011 compilation albums
Toni Gonzaga albums
Pop compilation albums
Star Music compilation albums